Leafy spurge may refer to several species of plant in the genus Euphorbia, including:

 Euphorbia esula, native to central and southern Europe
 Euphorbia virgata, native to Europe and Asia